Andrei Tarkovsky (1932–1986) was a Soviet filmmaker who is widely regarded as one of the greatest directors of all time. His films are Romanticist and are often described as "slow cinema", with the average shot-length in his final three films being over a minute (compared to seconds for most modern films). In his thirty-year career, Tarkovsky directed several student films, seven feature films, co-directed a documentary, and was the author of numerous screenplays. He also directed one stage play and wrote a book. 

Born in the Soviet Union, Tarkovsky began his career at the State Institute of Cinematography, where he directed several student films. In 1956, he made his directorial debut with the student film The Killers, an adaptation of Ernest Hemingway's eponymous short story. His first feature film was 1961's Ivan's Childhood, considered by some to be his most conventional film. It garnered him the Golden Lion at the Venice Film Festival. In 1966, he directed the biopic Andrei Rublev, which won him the International Critics' Prize at the Cannes Film Festival.

In 1972, he directed the science fiction film Solaris, which was a response to what Tarkovsky saw as the "phoniness" of Stanley Kubrick's 2001: A Space Odyssey (1968). Solaris was loosely based on the novel of the same title by Stanislaw Lem and won the Grand Prix at the Cannes Film Festival. His next film was Mirror (1975). In 1976, Tarkovsky directed his only play—a stage production of William Shakespeare's Hamlet at the Lenkom Theatre. Viewing Tarkovsky as a dissident, Soviet authorities shut down the production after only a few performances. His final film produced in the Soviet Union, Stalker (1979) garnered him the Prize of the Ecumenical Jury at Cannes. 

Tarkovsky left the Soviet Union in 1979 and directed the film Nostalghia and the accompanying documentary Voyage in Time. At the Cannes Film Festival, Nostalghia was awarded the Prize of the Ecumenical Jury but was blocked from receiving the Palme d'Or by Soviet authorities. In 1985, he published a book, Sculpting in Time, in which he explored art and cinema. His final film The Sacrifice (1986) was produced in Sweden, shortly before his death from cancer. The film garnered Tarkovsky his second Grand Prix at Cannes, as well as a second International Critics' Prize, a Best Artistic Contribution, and another Prize of the Ecumenical Jury. He was posthumously awarded the Lenin Prize in 1990, the most prestigious award in the Soviet Union.

Filmography

Films directed by Tarkovsky

Screenplays

Unfilmed scripts

Theatrical productions

Bibliography

References

Works cited

External links
 

Filmography
Tarkovsky
Tarkovsky